Kate Walsh (born 20 February 1983) is an English singer from Burnham-on-Crouch, Essex, England.

A graduate of the Brighton Institute of Modern Music, she released her first album, Clocktower Park (produced by Lee Russell), in 2003 by Kitchenware Records.  The album was named for a meeting place in her home town. In 2007, she released her second album, Tim's House. It quickly became the No. 1 album on the UK iTunes Store.  The album also features her most popular song, "Your Song". She gained iTunes customers' attention when her song Talk of the Town became the iTunes Free Single of the Week from the week beginning 20 March 2007.

Her third studio album, Light and Dark, was released in the UK on 31 August 2009. The lead single from the record, June Last Year, was released on 24 August. She began her UK tour at the end of September that year.

Her single Your Song was featured in the 2008 film Angus, Thongs and Perfect Snogging as well the 2008 film The Crew, the 2010 film The Decoy Bride, and on the TV show Grey's Anatomy. In 2011, she discussed the release of her newest album The Real Thing and her tour.

On 5 September 2012, she announced on her Facebook page that she would be taking an indefinite hiatus from her music career to do something else: "By taking time out and putting some distance between me and my songs I am now, for the first time, able to start letting go of the past and can begin to move forward in a new and exciting direction". She has not released any music since.

Discography

Studio albums

Extended plays

Singles

References

External links 

 
 Review of Clocktower Park
 The songbird who's outselling Take That with her homemade album
 Kate Walsh – refreshingly original
 Kate Walsh PR in Ireland

1977 births
British indie pop musicians
English folk musicians
Living people
Musicians from Essex
People from Burnham-on-Crouch
21st-century English women singers
21st-century English singers